Chabanière is a commune in the department of Rhône, eastern France. The municipality was established on 1 January 2017 by merger of the former communes of Saint-Maurice-sur-Dargoire (the seat), Saint-Didier-sous-Riverie and Saint-Sorlin.

See also 
Communes of the Rhône department

References 

Communes of Rhône (department)